Shilovsky (masculine), Shilovskaya (feminine), or Shilovskoye (neuter) may refer to:
Shilovsky District, a district of Ryazan Oblast
Shilovsky (rural locality) (Shilovskaya, Shilovskoye), name of several rural localities in Russia

See also
Shilovo